Club Deportivo Cultural Volante (sometimes referred as Cultural Volante) is a Peruvian football club, playing in the city of Bambamarca, Cajamarca, Peru.

History
The Club Deportivo Cultural Volante was founded on June 7, 1973.

The club was 2010 and 2011 Liga Superior de Cajamarca runner-up.

In the 2010 Copa Perú, the club classified to the Regional Stage, but was eliminated by Unión Comercio in the Group Stage.

In the 2011 Copa Perú, the club classified to the Regional Stage, but was eliminated by Universitario de Trujillo in the Group Stage.

In the 2018 Copa Perú, the club classified to the Departamental Stage, but was eliminated by ADA in the semifinals.

In the 2019 Copa Perú, the club classified to the National Stage, but was eliminated by Juventud Municipal in the Round of 32.

Honours

Regional
Liga Departamental de Cajamarca:
Winners (2): 1989, 2022
Runner-up (3): 2010, 2011, 2019

Liga Superior de Cajamarca:
Runner-up (2): 2010, 2011

Liga Provincial de Hualgayoc:
Winners (4): 1989, 2014, 2018, 2019

See also
List of football clubs in Peru
Peruvian football league system

References

External links

Football clubs in Peru
Association football clubs established in 1973
1973 establishments in Peru